Chen Kuei-ru (also transliterated as Chen Kuei-ju; born 22 September 1993) is a Taiwanese athlete competing in the sprint hurdles. He won a silver medal at the 2017 Summer Universiade.

His personal bests are 13.34 seconds in the 110 metres hurdles (+0.1 m/s, Taipei 2019) and 7.81 seconds in the 60 metres hurdles (Doha 2016). Both are current national records.

Competition record

References

1993 births
Living people
Taiwanese male hurdlers
Athletes (track and field) at the 2014 Asian Games
Athletes (track and field) at the 2018 Asian Games
People from Yunlin County
Universiade medalists in athletics (track and field)
Asian Games medalists in athletics (track and field)
Asian Games silver medalists for Chinese Taipei
Medalists at the 2018 Asian Games
Universiade silver medalists for Chinese Taipei
Medalists at the 2017 Summer Universiade
Athletes (track and field) at the 2020 Summer Olympics
Olympic athletes of Taiwan
21st-century Taiwanese people